George William Hill  (1861 in Shipton, Eastern Townships, Quebec – 1934) was a Canadian sculptor. He was known as one of Canada's foremost sculptor during the first half of the 20th century, because of his numerous public memorials.
He was a member of the Royal Canadian Academy of Arts. He traveled to Paris in 1889 to study at the École nationale des beaux-arts and at the Académie Julian, and returned to Montreal in 1894 to open his workshop and begin producing public memorials.

Works

 War Memorial, Harbord Collegiate School,286 Harbord St., Toronto, Ontario
 War Memorial, Pictou, Nova Scotia
 War Memorial, Westmount, Montreal, Quebec
 Charlottetown Veterans Memorial at Province House, Charlottetown, Prince Edward Island

References

External links 
 George Hill Letter at the National Gallery of Canada, Ottawa, Ontario.
 

1862 births
Sculptors from Quebec
1934 deaths
People from Estrie
Members of the Royal Canadian Academy of Arts
20th-century Canadian sculptors
Canadian male sculptors
20th-century Canadian male artists
19th-century Canadian sculptors
19th-century Canadian male artists